Friedrich Nerly may be either

 Friedrich von Nerly (1807-1878), German painter, or
 Friedrich Paul Nerly (1842-1919), his son, German-Italian painter